The acronym CMNH may refer to:

Carnegie Museum of Natural History in Pennsylvania
Cleveland Museum of Natural History in Ohio
Children's Miracle Network Hospitals, an international non-profit organization